Chromium is a member of group 6, of the transition metals. The +3 and +6 states occur most commonly within chromium compounds, followed by +2; charges of +1, +4 and +5 for chromium are rare, but do nevertheless occasionally exist.

Common oxidation states

Chromium(0) 
Many Cr(0) complexes are known.  Bis(benzene)chromium and chromium hexacarbonyl are highlights in organochromium chemistry.

Chromium(II) 

Chromium(II) compounds are uncommon, in part because they readily oxidize to chromium(III) derivatives in air.  Water-stable chromium(II) chloride  that can be made by reducing chromium(III) chloride with zinc. The resulting bright blue solution created from dissolving chromium(II) chloride is stable at neutral pH. Some other notable chromium(II) compounds include chromium(II) oxide , and chromium(II) sulfate . Many chromium(II) carboxylates are known. The red chromium(II) acetate (Cr2(O2CCH3)4) is somewhat famous. It features a Cr-Cr quadruple bond.

Chromium(III) 

A large number of chromium(III) compounds are known, such as chromium(III) nitrate, chromium(III) acetate, and chromium(III) oxide. Chromium(III) can be obtained by dissolving elemental chromium in acids like hydrochloric acid or sulfuric acid, but it can also be formed through the reduction of chromium(VI) by cytochrome c7.

Chromium(III) tends to form octahedral complexes. Commercially available chromium(III) chloride hydrate is the dark green complex [CrCl2(H2O)4]Cl. Closely related compounds are the pale green [CrCl(H2O)5]Cl2 and violet [Cr(H2O)6]Cl3. If anhydrous violet chromium(III) chloride is dissolved in water, the violet solution turns green after some time as the chloride in the inner coordination sphere is replaced by water. This kind of reaction is also observed with solutions of chrome alum and other water-soluble chromium(III) salts. A tetrahedral coordination of chromium(III) has been reported for the Cr-centered Keggin anion [α-CrW12O40]5–.

Chromium(III) hydroxide (Cr(OH)3) is amphoteric, dissolving in acidic solutions to form [Cr(H2O)6]3+, and in basic solutions to form . It is dehydrated by heating to form the green chromium(III) oxide (Cr2O3), a stable oxide with a crystal structure identical to that of corundum.

Chromium(VI) 

Chromium(VI) compounds are oxidants at low or neutral pH. Chromate anions and dichromate (Cr2O72−) anions are the principal ions at this oxidation state. They exist at an equilibrium, determined by pH:
2 [CrO4]2− + 2 H+  [Cr2O7]2− + H2O
Chromium(VI) oxyhalides are known also and include chromyl fluoride (CrO2F2) and chromyl chloride.  However, despite several erroneous claims, chromium hexafluoride (as well as all higher hexahalides) remains unknown, as of 2020.

Sodium chromate is produced industrially by the oxidative roasting of chromite ore with sodium carbonate. The change in equilibrium is visible by a change from yellow (chromate) to orange (dichromate), such as when an acid is added to a neutral solution of potassium chromate. At yet lower pH values, further condensation to more complex oxyanions of chromium is possible.

Both the chromate and dichromate anions are strong oxidizing reagents at low pH:
 + 14  + 6 e− → 2  + 21  (ε0 = 1.33 V)

They are, however, only moderately oxidizing at high pH:
 + 4  + 3 e− →  + 5  (ε0 = −0.13 V)

Chromium(VI) compounds in solution can be detected by adding an acidic hydrogen peroxide solution. The unstable dark blue chromium(VI) peroxide (CrO5) is formed, which can be stabilized as an ether adduct .

Chromic acid has the hypothetical formula . It is a vaguely described chemical, despite many well-defined chromates and dichromates being known. The dark red chromium(VI) oxide , the acid anhydride of chromic acid, is sold industrially as "chromic acid". It can be produced by mixing sulfuric acid with dichromate and is a strong oxidizing agent.

Other oxidation states 

Compounds of chromium(V) are rather rare; the oxidation state +5 is only realized in few compounds but are intermediates in many reactions involving oxidations by chromate. The only binary compound is the volatile chromium(V) fluoride (CrF5). This red solid has a melting point of 30 °C and a boiling point of 117 °C. It can be prepared by treating chromium metal with fluorine at 400 °C and 200 bar pressure. The peroxochromate(V) is another example of the +5 oxidation state. Potassium peroxochromate (K3[Cr(O2)4]) is made by reacting potassium chromate with hydrogen peroxide at low temperatures. This red brown compound is stable at room temperature but decomposes spontaneously at 150–170 °C.

Compounds of chromium(IV) are slightly more common than those of chromium(V). The tetrahalides, CrF4, CrCl4, and CrBr4, can be produced by treating the trihalides with the corresponding halogen at elevated temperatures. Such compounds are susceptible to disproportionation reactions and are not stable in water. Organic compounds containing Cr(IV) state such as chromium tetra t-butoxide are also known.

Most chromium(I) compounds are obtained solely by oxidation of electron-rich, octahedral chromium(0) complexes. Other chromium(I) complexes contain cyclopentadienyl ligands. As verified by X-ray diffraction, a Cr-Cr quintuple bond (length 183.51(4)  pm) has also been described. Extremely bulky monodentate ligands stabilize this compound by shielding the quintuple bond from further reactions.

Notes

See also
 Chromium
 Cobalt compounds

References

Chromium
Chromium compounds
Chemical compounds by element